VV Nieuwenhoorn is a football club from Nieuwenhoorn, Netherlands. Nieuwenhoorn is playing in the Saturday Vierde Klasse. Its grounds are Sportpark Nieuwenhoorn.

History 
The club was founded on 1 June 1929. 

It won the 1980 KNVB District Cup for Sunday amateur clubs in the West 2 District. One year later, Nieuwenhoorn won the District Cup for all amateur clubs in the same district.

In 2013, Niewenhoorn started a Saturday squad and in 2014 it dropped its Sunday squad. In 2022, Nieuwenhoorn ended runner-up during the Eerste Klasse season. It promoted to the Vierde Klasse after heavy clashes between supporters in the decisive playoff game against WHC Wezep. The decisive penalties were taken after the supporters had been dispersed by the police.

Head coach

Saturday squad 
 Steef Buijs (2015–2018)
 Oscar Biesheuvel (2021–)

Sunday squad 
 Adrie Poldervaart (2002–2005)
 Wim Schaap (2012–2014)

References 

Football clubs in the Netherlands
1929 establishments in the Netherlands
Association football clubs established in 1929
Football clubs in South Holland
Sport in Voorne aan Zee